Cat's paw or Catspaw may refer to:

 "Cat's paw", an idiom, meaning "the dupe of another", derived from Jean de La Fontaine's fable "The Monkey and the Cat"

Arts and entertainment
 Catspaw (TV series), a 1978 Australian series
 "Catspaw" (Star Trek: The Original Series), a television episode
 The Cat's-Paw, a 1934 film with Harold Lloyd
 Cat's Paw (1959 film), a Looney Tunes cartoon
 Catspaw (comics), April Dumaka, a superhero character in DC Comics
 Cat's Paw (adventure), for the role-playing game Marvel Super Heroes
 Catspaw, a 1988 science fiction novel by Joan D. Vinge
 Catspaw, a 2021 album by Matthew Sweet
 Catspaw, a Valyrian steel dagger in Game of Thrones.

Nature
 Cat's Paw Mussel, one of a few species of Epioblasma mussels
 Catspaw, informal name of some species of the plant Anigozanthus (Haemodoraceae)
 Cat's Paw Nebula or Bear Claw Nebula, common names for NGC 6334
 Cat's paw (wave), in Earth sciences, a pattern of shallow ripples (capillary waves) on the surface of water

Technology
 Cat's paw (knot), a knot used for connecting a rope to an object, similar to a cow hitch but less prone to slipping
 Cat's paw (tool), a hand tool for extracting nails, typically from wood, named for its historic shape